Jacob Albrechtsen (born 10 March 1990) is a retired Danish football centre back.

He is the younger brother of Martin Albrechtsen.

Career
He was promoted to the first team at training start in the summer 2008, together with Danni Jensen. Although, both of them joined the first team at a training camp at La Manga Club in January 2008.

Albrechtsen's first team debut came on 31 July 2008 in a UEFA Cup qualifier against Cliftonville from Northern Ireland. He played the last 19 minutes in the defense after having substituted Oscar Wendt.

Albrechtsen decided to retire at the end of the 2018-19 season.

Honours
Danish Superliga: 2008–09 & 2009–10
Danish Cup: 2008–09
Danish U-16 League Champion: 2005

References

External links
F.C. Copenhagen profile
Danish national team profile

1990 births
Living people
Danish men's footballers
Ledøje-Smørum Fodbold players
F.C. Copenhagen players
BK Avarta players
Danish 2nd Division players
Association football defenders